Montegiovi is a village in Tuscany, central Italy,  administratively a frazione of the comune of Castel del Piano, province of Grosseto, in the area of Mount Amiata. At the time of the 2001 census its population amounted to 168.

Montegiovi is about 50 km from Grosseto and 5 km from Castel del Piano, and it is situated on a hill in the western limit of Val d'Orcia.

Main sights 

 Church of San Martino (13th century), main parish church of the village
 Church of Madonna degli Schiavi (16th century), also known as Madonna delle Grazie, with frescoes by Francesco Nasini, it was re-built in the 19th century
 Chapel of Sant'Elena, ancient church at the service of the castle of Montegiovi
 Walls of Montegiovi, old fortifications which surround the village since the 12th century
 The Giardino di Piero Bonacina, a contemporary art garden with sculptures by artist Piero Bonacina.

References

Bibliography 
 Aldo Mazzolai, Guida della Maremma. Percorsi tra arte e natura, Le Lettere, Florence, 1997
 Giuseppe Guerrini, Torri e castelli della Provincia di Grosseto, Nuova Immagine Editrice, Siena, 1999

See also 
 Castel del Piano
 Montenero d'Orcia
 Val d'Orcia

Frazioni of the Province of Grosseto